Lurking in Suburbia is a 2006 comedy film written and directed by Mitchell Altieri, produced by Altieri and Phil Flores, and stars Joe Egender, Samuel Child, Ari Zaragis, and Buffy Charlet.

Plot 
On his thirtieth birthday, Conrad Stevens, a small-time writer, becomes disenchanted with his immature lifestyle and begins to wonder if there's more to life than partying and casual sex.

Cast 
 Joe Egender as Conrad
 Samuel Child as Sean
 Ari Zaragis as Danny
 and Buffy Charlet as Frankie
 Riley Plattner as punk store kid

Release 
Lurking in Suburbia was released on DVD on May 30, 2006.

Reception 
Variety dismissed the film as "yet another depiction of the collective anomie felt by a group of thirtysomething friends clinging to their high-school glory days. Tyro writer-director Mitchell Altieri's thin, but occasionally engaging pic plods along a path well-trodden by indie filmmakers of the '90s, particularly Whit Stillman and Noah Baumbach, while never amassing the rich characterizations or pointed insights that have distinguished this genre's more memorable efforts."  Don R. Lewis of Film Threat rated it 4/5 stars and wrote, "Lurking in Suburbia isn’t a perfect film, but it's a damn good one."  Scott Weinberg of DVD Talk rated it 4/5 stars and described it as "a sly, personal, and low-key indie comedy that manages to become more accessible and likable the longer it goes on."  David Johnson of DVD Verdict called it "an authentic, lighthearted, well-acted look at one guy's struggles with growing up."

Reception

External links 
 
 

2006 films
2006 comedy films
American comedy films
American independent films
2000s English-language films
2000s American films